Jaime Yusept Espinal Fajardo (born October 14, 1984) is a Dominican-born Puerto Rican freestyle wrestler. In 2012 he became the first Olympic medalist in wrestling for Puerto Rico by winning a silver medal in the 84 kg division.

Early years and education
Espinal was born to Jaime Felix Espinal and Alejandrina Fajardo Hernández. He has two siblings: Stanley and Rosemary. When he was 5 years old, his family moved to Puerto Rico. Espinal studied at the Baptist College and then Gabriela Mistral High School. He began wrestling when he was nine years old when coach Pedro Rojas approached him and other kids and invited them to Club Sparta in Río Piedras along with Franklin Gómez.

When he was 15 years old, Espinal and his mother moved to Brooklyn, New York. Espinal stated he had to deal with racism and fights "every two or three days". After a real bad fight, his mother decided to send him back to Puerto Rico alone. Espinal stop wrestling and began cheerleading and dancing. He received a scholarship in cheerleading from the University of Puerto Rico at Bayamón. Espinal continued college at Walden University in Pennsylvania. He completed a Bachelor's degree in computer design.

Before his international wrestling career, Espinal spent three years as a breakdancer for the Time Machine Squad, entering the group after winning a contest. In 2008, he went by the name of "Olimpic Jumps" as part of the group. During that time, he served as a backup dancer for hip hop artists like Daddy Yankee and Tego Calderón. He also practiced baseball and worked as a model. However, convinced by coach Rojas, Espinal returned to wrestling.

Wrestling career
To prepare for the 2010 Central American and Caribbean Games, his coach, Pedro Rojas, sent Espinal to train in Cuba for nine months. As a result, Espinal won gold at the Central American and Caribbean Games in Mayagüez, Puerto Rico.

In 2011, Espinal finished in fifth place at the 2011 Pan American Games in Guadalajara, Mexico. That same year, he won silver at the Pan American Wrestling Qualifying Tournament in Florida.

The next year, Espinal continued to excel in the sport finishing third at the Romanian International Tournament, and winning gold at the Città di Sassari Wrestling Championship in Italy. That year, at the 2012 Panamerican Wrestling Tournament in Kissimmee, Florida, Espinal qualified for the 2012 Summer Olympics.

2012 Olympics
At the 2012 Summer Olympics in London, England, Espinal began the first rounds by defeating Nigerian Andrew Dick and Georgian Dato Marsagishvili. On the semi-finals, he defeated Soslan Gattsiev, from Belarus, to advance to the final round against Sharif Sharifov, from Azerbaijan. In the match, Sharifov defeated Espinal 3–1 to earn the gold. Espinal finished with the silver medal. His medal was Puerto Rico's second silver in 17 Summer Olympics, and their second medal as a country in London.

2016 Olympics 
At the 2016 Summer Olympics in Rio de Janeiro, Espinal was defeated in the first round of the 86 kg division by Selim Yaşar of Turkey. He was then defeated in the repechage by Reineris Salas of Cuba. Espinal was the flag bearer for Puerto Rico during the Parade of Nations.

Personal life
Espinal is in a relationship with Mexican wrestler Jane Valencia. Their first daughter Joy Espinal Valencia was born on May 31, 2017.

See also
 Dominican Republic immigration to Puerto Rico

References

External links

Jaime Espinal's Rokfin Channel
Jaime Espinal Profile at COPUR
 

Living people
1984 births
Wrestlers at the 2012 Summer Olympics
Wrestlers at the 2016 Summer Olympics
Olympic silver medalists for Puerto Rico
Olympic wrestlers of Puerto Rico
Dominican Republic expatriates in Puerto Rico
Olympic medalists in wrestling
Medalists at the 2012 Summer Olympics
Puerto Rican male sport wrestlers
Pan American Games bronze medalists for Puerto Rico
Pan American Games medalists in wrestling
Wrestlers at the 2015 Pan American Games
Central American and Caribbean Games gold medalists for Puerto Rico
Central American and Caribbean Games bronze medalists for Puerto Rico
Competitors at the 2010 Central American and Caribbean Games
Competitors at the 2014 Central American and Caribbean Games
Central American and Caribbean Games medalists in wrestling
Medalists at the 2015 Pan American Games